Eglinton is a locality in the Western Australian capital city of Perth, approximately  north of Perth's central business district on the Indian Ocean. For the most part, the suburb is covered in native banksia woodland, scrubland and heath typical of the Swan Coastal Plain. However, in recent years, there has been growth in residential estates, with a town centre to be built in the near future. There are also plans for the Joondalup railway line to be extended through the suburb (terminating in Yanchep) with Eglinton railway station to be located inside Allara estate.

Part of the City of Wanneroo local government area, it is bounded to the north by Yanchep, to the east by Carabooda and to the south by Alkimos. The area is part of the Alkimos-Eglinton region being considered by the State Government for a future urban region.

Eglinton is now being developed with the Amberton estate from Stockland and Allara Estate from Satterly, which is one of only two estates in Western Australia to achieve a six star energy rating.

History
Eglinton was approved in 1974 as a suburb name and is named after the barque Eglinton, which was wrecked on rocks near Alkimos that now bear its name.

Prior to European settlement, the Mooro tribe of the Noongar people had lived in what has become the northern Perth metropolitan region for more than 40,000 years, taking advantage of the abundant food and water around the chain of wetlands on the Swan Coastal Plain. According to local legend, Pipidinny Swamp, located in eastern Eglinton, was created from the blood and meat of the crocodile's tail as he walked back towards the Swan River after his fight with the shark.

In 1865, European settlers used the Aboriginal tracks along the west side of the lakes as a stock route from Dongara to Fremantle. The portion of the stock route between Joondalup and Yanchep was made part of the Bicentennial Heritage Trails Network in 1988, and is now known as the Yaberoo Budjara Heritage Trail.

The area is mostly scrub and bushland today but also has some low-level agriculture based along Wanneroo and Pipidinny Roads as well as housing estates abutting Marmion Avenue.

Planning

As of May 2006 plans for an Alkimos-Eglinton satellite city, covered by Amendment 1029/33 to the Metropolitan Region Scheme were revealed. At that point LandCorp estimated that 55,000 people will live in the area once it is complete, that the centre will include "hospitals, tertiary educational institutions, major retail, commercial and recreational facilities" and that stage 1 blocks would be offered for sale in 2008. The Environmental Protection Authority, however, raised concerns in November 2005 about the amendment, saying that it "would, in part, be inconsistent with the conservation and protection of significant environmental and geoheritage values in the area", and recommended that the amount of reserves be greatly increased.
The next major waste water treatment plant for the metropolitan region was built in the Eglinton area. It is designed to provide catchment from Two Rocks south to the existing Beenyup treatment plant catchment boundary.

Geography
Eglinton lies roughly between the proposed Mitchell Freeway to the east and the Indian Ocean to the west.

Eglinton's population was measured by the ABS in the 2016 census as 2,365 with the projected population for 2021 being 6,983.

Facilities
Eglinton has no conventional facilities at the present stage but the Amberton and Allara estates are now under development with some houses built, many more under construction and many blocks titled.

Amberton is joined to Shorehaven, which will have very significant infrastructure.

Eglinton was previously accessible only by Pipidinny Road, which runs via Pipidinny Swamp to within  of the beach. The Alkimos wreck can be viewed from the nearby coastline, where almost untouched beaches are accessible by sand track but a paved road is currently under construction. The suburb offers a wide array of native scrubland, woodland and heath, varying in condition from excellent to completely degraded, and including Xanthorrhoea preissii (commonly known as "black boys"), banksia, sheoak and Nuytsia floribunda. Some degradation has occurred due to uncontrolled vehicular access, clearing for stock grazing, fire and rabbits.

Transport
In 2008, Marmion Avenue was extended through the suburb, which had previously been unserviced by the road network. On 14 December 2008, the 490 and 491 Transperth service between Butler train station, Two Rocks and Yanchep. The 490 was rerouted from Wanneroo Road to Marmion Avenue through the middle of Eglinton, Those bus routes are operated by Swan Transit.

References

External links
 Metropolitan Region Scheme Amendment 1029/33 Alkimos-Eglinton

Suburbs of Perth, Western Australia
Suburbs of the City of Wanneroo